

Hans Zorn (27 October 1891 – 2 August 1943) was a German general in the Wehrmacht during World War II. He was a recipient of the Knight's Cross of the Iron Cross with Oak Leaves of Nazi Germany. Zorn was killed on 2 August 1943 by Soviet fire during Operation Kutuzov. He was posthumously awarded the Oak leaves to his Knight's Cross on 3 September 1943.

Awards and decorations
 Iron Cross (1914) 2nd Class (23 October 1914) & 1st Class (29 January 1916)

 Clasp to the Iron Cross (1939) 2nd Class (14 May 1940) & 1st Class (26 May 1940)
 German Cross in Gold on 14 June 1942 as General der Infanterie in the XXXXVI. Armeekorps (motorized)
 Knight's Cross of the Iron Cross with Oak Leaves
 Knight's Cross on 27 July 1941 as Generalmajor and commander of 20. Infanterie-Division
 291st Oak Leaves on 3 September 1943 as General der Infanterie and commander of XXXXVI. Panzerkorps

References

Citations

Bibliography

 
 
 

1891 births
1943 deaths
Generals of Infantry (Wehrmacht)
German Army personnel of World War I
People from the Kingdom of Bavaria
Recipients of the Gold German Cross
Recipients of the Knight's Cross of the Iron Cross with Oak Leaves
Military personnel from Munich
German Army personnel killed in World War II
Recipients of the clasp to the Iron Cross, 1st class
Reichswehr personnel
German Army generals of World War II